The 1995–96 Umaglesi Liga was the seventh season of top-tier football in Georgia. It began on 2 August 1995 and ended on 27 May 1996. Dinamo Tbilisi were the defending champions.

Locations

League standings

Results

Top goalscorers

See also
1995–96 Pirveli Liga
1995–96 Georgian Cup

References
Georgia - List of final tables (RSSSF)

Erovnuli Liga seasons
1
Georgia